is an animated television series created by Leiji Matsumoto. It is the sequel to the 1982 animated film Arcadia of My Youth. However, like many of the stories set in the Leijiverse, the continuity of the series does not necessarily agree with other Harlock series or films.

The series premiered just as the Gundam craze began in Japan. Mobile Suit Gundam ushered in a new era of more realistic Sci-Fi anime that made the fantasy and melodrama of Captain Harlock seem outdated. Therefore, the series suffered low viewer ratings and was ended after 22 episodes - half of what was originally planned.

Plot 
At the end of Arcadia of My Youth, Captain Harlock and the crew of the spaceship Arcadia had been banished from Earth. Earth, as well as many other planets in the universe, had been taken over by the Illumidas, a race of destructive humanoids, who ruin, enslave, and/or destroy almost any inhabitable planet they come across. In Endless Orbit SSX, Harlock battles the Illumidas while searching for a mythical "Planet of Peace," where all the peoples of the universe can live freely and without war.

It was not intended for Endless Orbit SSX to serve as a prequel to Galaxy Express 999 and the 1978 Space Pirate Captain Harlock TV series, as both Galaxy Express and SSX contradict each other, as well as the backstory given in the 1978 Space Pirate series. The 1989-1993 American comic book adaptations by Eternity Comics did, however, attempt to establish a continuity. The comic book series was not an actual adaptation of SSX, but liberally borrowed elements from the series, while introducing new ones in an attempt to establish a continuity with the Galaxy Express and Space Pirate series.

Characters 
Captain Harlock
The Captain is an idealistic and chivalrous man, but not prone to showing much emotion. He shares a strong bond with Tochiro Oyama, who built his ship, Arcadia. The ancestors of the two men were also friends.

Before he became a pirate, Harlock was a Captain in the Solar Federation, a human military organization. His first post at the helm of a star ship was as the Captain of the ship, Deathshadow, a ship which later would be used against him.  After the Illumidas took over Earth, and his wife Maya was killed, he was banished to space.  Harlock became an outlaw and the captain of the Arcadia.

Harlock is a very skilled fighter and pilot. He is also quite intelligent, though most of this intelligence is displayed in combat. His combat ability was tested after the Deathshadow was sent after him with a computer programmed to fight like Harlock controlling the old ship. It was one of the few times that Captain Harlock has shown his emotions so vividly, as the ship caused him to become angry and frustrated.

Tochiro Oyama
A small, silly looking man with large glasses, Tochiro is extremely intelligent. He built the whole of the Arcadia by himself, and later inserted his mind into the ship's computer. He can generally be found on the bridge of the ship, or working in the computer room or the engine room. He loves to tinker with electronic things. In one episode Tochiro rebuilds an old radio on the ship, and then later communicates with Harlock via this radio using a second radio that builds out of parts salvaged from a destroyed Illumidas ship.

He is generally very friendly, though he is sometimes quick to anger, even with friends. He will staunchly defend his beliefs, his great friend Captain Harlock, and Emeraldas, whom he has a crush on. By contrast, when faced with enemies or a bar fight, he will remain calm, or even allow himself to be humiliated if it means either not fighting or getting the upper hand eventually.

Emeraldas
Though she only appears in a few episodes, Emeraldas had a substantial role in Arcadia of My Youth and is a major character in the Lejiverse. She is an old friend of Harlock's, and is very much like him in many ways. She has similar beliefs as him, and also fights against the Illumidas on her ship the Queen Emeraldas. However she is more solitary than Harlock, with herself being the only crew member of her ship. She does eventually fall in love with Tochiro, though she never says so outright, and he dies before a relationship can develop. This is somewhat different from the 1978 Space Pirate series where Emeraldas and Tochiro are definitely in a relationship and have a child. Also, Emeraldas became solitary only after Tochiro's death.

Emeraldas' trade mark is a single red rose. She leaves one to show she is or has been at a location, and also gives them as a token of farewell.

Kei Yuki
Kei is another of the Arcadia's young crew members, though she is treated as an adult by the rest of the crew. She is a kind and brave girl, who risks her life for her crew mate Tochiro. She is also trusted by young Rebi, and brings human emotion to the often stoic bridge crew.

Kei grew up on a small space station with her father Goro, a publisher of Anti-Illumidas newspapers. Captain Herlock came to the station to find out more information about the "Treasure Island Legend". Though Goro distrusted him at first, the elder Yuki eventually sacrifices his life so that the Arcadia, with his daughter on board, can escape. He would further influence his daughter's life when it is revealed that Kei has the "Treasure Island Legend" information embedded in her sub-conscience, thanks to him. Kei Yuki also appears in the 1978 Space Pirate series but is given a different background story.

La Mime
La Mime is a humanoid creature who looks like a mouthless, blank-eyed female. When she speaks a blue light winks on and off along with her words. She works on the bridge of the Arcadia, and rarely is seen far from her post.

Like the Captain, La Mime usually shows little emotion, but this may be because of her facial features. She feels a great sorrow for her planet, which was destroyed by the Illumidas. She was enslaved by them, though she later escaped them after helping Harlock act against them.

La Mime treasures a sea shell that is all she has of her home, Planet Allosaurus. She loves it so much that she is able to distinguish a fake that Harlock had made to tell between her and an impostor.  She later gives the shell to Rebi. La Mime is similar to Mimay from the 1978 Space Pirate series in that both lack a mouth. The two characters are somewhat different in personality and ship duties, however.

Mr. Zone
Mr. Zone is a human who has joined the Illumidas. He has become a traitor to the human race largely thanks to his hatred of Captain Harlock. When they both were in the Solar Federation, Harlock caused Zone to lose his job as a ship designer when Harlock claimed his ship designs were unsafe. Mr. Zone's thirst for revenge caused him to join the Illumidas, who also want Captain Harlock and the Arcadia destroyed.

Later, Mr. Zone reveals a second motive - a desired to rule the universe. He secretly put together a force of humans, who help Zone take over an Illumidas ship after he acquires the Fire of St. Valkyrie, an immensely powerful force.

The character Alexander Nevich in the American 1989-1993 Eternity Comics Captain Harlock comic books is clearly based on Mr. Zone in both appearance and character.

Tadashi Monono
Tadashi is the second youngest member of the crew, and like Rebi, he is an orphan. His family died during an Illumidas invasion on his planet and the starvation that followed. He originally planned to kill Harlock and collect the sizable bounty on the Captain's head. Instead, he ends up joining Harlock's crew as their cook.

Tadashi is often hot heated and impulsive, and wants to be treated as an adult, though he is still a child. He does eventually prove himself his worth when he alone goes on a mission to destroy a computer whose mind controlling waves only affects adults. This is a totally separate character from Tadashi Daiba who is seen in the 1978 Space Pirate series. The U.S. Eternity comics adaptation has another character named Tadashi who is not only slightly younger but, unlike other versions, is written to serve as the audience surrogate.

Rebi
Rebi (alternately, "Revi") is a young girl whose mother is dead and whose father is a mystery to her. All she knows is that he is in space somewhere. She is adopted by Dr. Ban and later joins the crew of the Arcadia, after they save her and the doctor from an attack on the transport ship they were traveling on. Though she is too young to do any real work, she does help Tadashi in his duties as cook. At first she has a childish crush on the young cook, but later these two, the youngest people aboard the Arcadia, develop a good friendship.

Rebi eventually meets Capitan Bentselle, the man who is her father, but she is unaware of his true identity. Later, at Christmas time, she finally gets a chance to speak with him. Sadly, he died after sacrificing himself to save the Arcadia, leaving Rebi a true orphan.

Capitan Bentselle
Capitan Bentselle is the father of Rebi, and was Captain of the starship Deathshadow. He originally was a patsy of the Illumidas, and was sent to destroy Captain Harlock and the Arcadia. However, after inadvertently kidnapping his own daughter (as well as Dr. Ban), he became ashamed of himself and ceased combat with the Arcadia.

After sustaining great injuries which left him a cripple and needing the use of several cybernetic prostheses, he eventually reappears to save his daughter. The Deathshadow was placed under the control of a computer programmed with all of Harlock's maneuvers. Thus Harlock could not defeat it. So Bentselle, after speaking to his daughter for the last time, infiltrated the Deathshadow and destroyed it, dying in the process.

Dr. Ban
Dr. Ban is a friendly, somewhat timid man, who adopts young Rebi after the death of her mother. He joins the Arcadia with her, and joins the crew as the ship's doctor. He also becomes quite friendly with young Tadashi, and the three are often seen together. In the Eternity Comics comic book series, Dr. Ban is called Dr. Zero who was the doctor character in 1978 series Space Pirate Captain Harlock. Dr. Ban and Dr. Zero are two different characters in the original Japanese series.

There is also a character named Dr. Ban in Galaxy Express 999 but the character is so different from the doctor in SSX that no relation is generally assumed between the two.

Illumidas

The Illumidas are a species of humanoids who are militaristic and aggressively trying to expand their empire.  Any planet that they take over becomes covered in wasteland, with most of the native inhabitants being either killed or enslaved.  A few individuals from captured planets choose to work for the Illumidas, and some, like Mr. Zone, have managed to rise to a position of power in the Illumidas army.

The males are similar in appearance to human males, except they have green skin, and their hair often grows around the top and outer side of their eyes like thick eyebrows.  They are identical in appearance to the inhabitants of the Comet Empire of Matsumoto's Space Battleship Yamato, though no connection is ever stated.  The Illumidas are also generally the same height as humans, though there are few very short Illumidas males (there are none that are as short as men like Tochiro).   No female Illumidas are ever shown, at least none that are green-skinned.  Their home planet is only shown briefly, from a distance, before it is destroyed.

Episodes

External links 
 The Captain Harlock Archives
 
 

1982 anime television series debuts
Adventure anime and manga
Captain Harlock
Discotek Media
Science fiction anime and manga
Toei Animation television